Engineer Regiment colloquially known as "The Sappers", is the Engineer arm of the Namibian Army based at Otavi. It is an independent regiment that functions as the Army's Engineer Corps and hosts all the engineer squadrons of the Army. It was founded in 1991 as the engineer company, later it was upgraded into the Engineer regiment.

Role

The regiment is a significant player in the government's de mining efforts as the northern part of the Country have been left with numerous unexploded ordnance (UXO) as a result of the South African Border War. NDF sappers have been trained by the US government since 1995 in demining.

Equipment

The Regiment uses the following Equipment:
Toyota Hilux
Toyota Land Cruiser
Wer'wolf MKII
Bull Dozer
Tipper Truck
Water Bowser
Grader
Metal detector

Sub Units
Headquarters Squadron
Construction Engineer Squadron
Combat Engineer Squadron

Training
Service personnel specializing in Engineering are trained at various institutions in the country including from the United States Department of Defence.

Leadership

References

Military of Namibia